The  is the third tallest building and fifth tallest structure in Japan, standing  high. Until surpassed by Abeno Harukas in 2014, it stood as the tallest building in Japan. It is located in the Minato Mirai 21 district of Yokohama city, next to the Yokohama Museum of Art.

The building contains a five-star hotel which occupies floors 49–70, with 603 rooms in total. The lower 48 floors contain shops, restaurants, clinics, and offices. The building contains two tuned mass dampers on the (hidden) 71st floor on opposite corners of the building.

On the 69th floor there is an observatory, Sky Garden, from which one can see a 360-degree view of the city and, on clear days, Mount Fuji.

This speed allows the elevator to reach the 69th floor in approximately 40 seconds. The elevators' speed record was surpassed by elevators of Taipei 101 (60.6 km/h, 37.7 mi/h) in 2004.

The building was designed by the architecture and engineering division of Mitsubishi Estate, now Mitsubishi Jisho Sekkei and Hugh Stubbins and Associates, later KlingStubbins.

In popular culture
Godzilla vs. Mothra
Godzilla, Mothra and King Ghidorah: Giant Monsters All-Out Attack

See also

 List of tallest buildings in Japan
 List of public observation decks

References

External links

 The Landmark Tower official site
 

Commercial buildings completed in 1993
Skyscrapers in Yokohama
Mitsubishi Estate
Skyscraper office buildings in Japan
Skyscraper hotels in Japan
Retail buildings in Japan
1993 establishments in Japan